"She Left Me on Friday" is the second single taken from the Shed Seven album Let It Ride. It was released on 2 March 1998 and made it to number 11 on the UK Singles Chart.

The song also appears on the band's compilation albums Going For Gold and The Singles Collection, along with the live albums Where Have You Been Tonight? and Live At The BBC.

Track listing
7" vinyl
She Left Me On Friday (3:31)
Bottom Upwards (4:28)

CD1
She Left Me On Friday (3:31)
Bottom Upwards (4:28)
Melpomene (3:20)

CD2
She Left Me On Friday (3:31)
My Misspent Youth (3:32)
You (4:58)

1998 singles
Shed Seven songs